Elbi is a village in Tori Parish, Pärnu County in southwestern Estonia.

Tootsi station on the Edelaraudtee's western route is located in Elbi.

References

 

Villages in Pärnu County